Bob-Manuel Obidimma Udokwu  (born 18 April 1968) is a Nigerian actor, director, producer and politician. In 2014, he received the Lifetime Achievement award at the 10th Africa Movie Academy Awards. He was nominated for Best Actor in a supporting role at the 2013 Nollywood Movies Awards for his role in Adesuwa.

Background 
He is from Nkwelle-Ogidi, Idemili North L.G.A. of  Anambra State, Nigeria. He is of Igbo ethnicity. The name of his father is Geoffrey Nwafor Udokwu and the name of his mother is Ezelagbo Udokwu. He was born in Enugu State. He is the fourth child in a family of 6 children. He is also the second son. He comes from a family which consists of three male and three female children.

Education 

He attended St. Peters Primary School (now Hillside Primary School) in the Coal Camp, Enugu, Enugu State for his elementary education, and  Oraukwu Grammar School, Oraukwu, Anambra State for his secondary education. He proceeded to the University of Port Harcourt, Port Harcourt, Rivers State where he obtained a Bachelor of Arts Degree in Theatre Arts. He bagged a master's degree in Political Science with a specialization in International Relations from the University of Lagos, Lagos State. He was the president of the Nigeria University Theater Art Student Association for the year 1989-1990

Personal life 

Udokwu met his wife Cassandra Joseph when he was doing his master's degree program at the University of Lagos, while she was an undergraduate at the university. They married on 19 February 2000. They have two children: Elyon Chinaza (a girl) and Marcus Garvey (a boy). He named his son, Garvey Udokwu after the political leader, Marcus Garvey. He is a Christian. He was appointed by the governor of Anambra state, Charles Soludo, as a special adviser on entertainment, tourism, and media.

Filmography

Film
Living in Bondage
Rattlesnake
True Confessions
When the Sun Sets
Karishika
The Key for Happiness
Black Maria
What a World
Heaven after Hell
A Time to Love
Cover Up
Endless Tears
Naked Sin
My Time
Home Apart
Games Men Play
Soul Engagement
Living in Bondage: Breaking Free

Television
At Your Service
Checkmate

See also
 List of Igbo people
 List of Nigerian film producers

References

External links

Nigerian film directors
Nigerian film producers
Nigerian actor-politicians
Lifetime Achievement Award Africa Movie Academy Award winners
Living people
1968 births
20th-century Nigerian male actors
Nigerian male film actors
University of Lagos alumni
University of Port Harcourt alumni
Igbo male actors
Nigerian Christians
People from Anambra State
Nigerian politicians
21st-century Nigerian male actors